Nigeria  competed at the inaugural World Beach Games in Doha, Qatar from 12 to 16 October 2019. In total, athletes representing Nigeria originally won one gold medal and one silver medal. In February 2021 however, silver medallist Mercy Genesis was found guilty of doping offences committed at the Games. She was stripped of her medal.

Medal summary

Medalists

References 

Nations at the 2019 World Beach Games
World Beach Games